Mukim Keriam is a mukim in Tutong District, Brunei. The population was 9,707 in 2016.

Name 
The mukim is named after Kampong Keriam, one of the villages it encompasses.

Geography 
The mukim is located in the north-east of Tutong District, bordering the South China Sea to the north, Mukim Sengkurong and Mukim Pengkalan Batu in Brunei-Muara District to the east, Mukim Kiudang to the south, and Mukim Pekan Tutong to the west.

Demographics 
As of 2016 census, the population was 9,707 with  males and  females. It had 1,773 households occupying 1,762 dwellings. The mukim is predominantly rural, with  living in rural areas.

Villages 
As of 2016, the mukim comprised the following census villages:

References 

Keriam
Tutong District